The 1983 Maghreb Athletics Championships was the ninth edition of the international athletics competition between the countries of the Maghreb. Morocco, Algeria, Tunisia and Libya were the competing nations. Organised by the Union des Fédérations d'Athlétisme du Maghreb Uni (Union of Athletics Federations of the United Maghreb), it took place in Casablanca, Morocco from 15–17 July. A total of 39 athletics events were contested, 23 for men and 16 for women.

Morocco and Algeria each won fifteen gold medals at the competition, with Morocco edging the top spot through its haul of 16 silver medals. Tunisia was a comfortable third, while Libya won two gold medals in the men's horizontal jumps. It was the third and last time that Libya attended the Maghreb Championships. The competition was staged one month prior to the wider regional 1983 Arab Athletics Championships.

The event was part of a flourish of athletics championships in the mid-1980s in Casablanca, Morocco's largest city. The Mediterranean Games was held two months after the Maghreb event. This was followed by the 1984 Arab Junior Athletics Championships, and finally the 1985 Pan Arab Games.

Medal summary

Men

Women

References

Champions
Les championnats maghrebins d athletisme. Union Sportive Oudja. Retrieved on 2015-02-20.

Maghreb Athletics Championships
Sport in Casablanca
Maghreb Athletics Championships
Maghreb Athletics Championships
20th century in Casablanca
International athletics competitions hosted by Morocco